Alexandra Ordolis (born July 9, 1986) is a Greek-Canadian actress having had roles as Sister Delphine on the 2015 TV series Reign, Shelly in The Mist (2017), Ollie in Shadowhunters: The Mortal Instruments (2018) and 
Caro in Nurses (Canadian TV series) 2020.

Early life
Ordolis was born in Athens, Greece to a Greek father and a British mother. She lived in Athens for her first few years, then moved to Montreal and spent most of her childhood there. She attended McGill University, graduating in 2007 with a degree in English and philosophy. She then attended the National Theatre School of Canada in Montreal between 2008-2011, then the CFC Actors Conservatory from 2012-2013. She achieved Level 8 in ballet at the Royal Academy Of Dancing.

Career
Ordolis first appeared on screen in 2009 in the movie Recon 2023: The Gauda Prime Conspiracy as a cute army girl. In 2010 she played Anna Bell Johnson  in The Will: Family Secrets Revealed, then in Blue Mountain State in 2011. In 2012 Alexandra made an appearance in the documentary Flight of the Butterflies as a female volunteer.

Ordolis secured many brief appearances in short films and TV series episodes during 2014 before landing a reoccurring role as Delphine in Reign, opposite Adelaide Kane and Megan Follows, and Justine in 19-2 in 2015. She became a regular cast member of Shadowhunters: The Mortal Instruments in 2017, as well as starring alongside Alyssa Sutherland in The Mist as Shelley DeWitt for 7 episodes. In 2020, Ordolis played the lesbian lover Caro in Nurses (Canadian TV series).

Personal life
Ordolis does yoga, and enjoys sports such as downhill skiing, cycling, and swimming.

Filmography

Film

Television

References

External links
 

1986 births
Living people
Actresses from Athens
Actresses from Toronto
Canadian film actresses
Canadian people of Greek descent
Canadian television actresses
21st-century Canadian actresses
McGill University alumni